Yashahime: Princess Half-Demon is a Japanese anime television series, and the sequel to Rumiko Takahashi's manga series Inuyasha produced by Sunrise. It was first announced in May 2020, and is directed by Teruo Sato with all characters designed by Takahashi. Most of the main cast and staff from the series returned, with Katsuyuki Sumisawa in charge of the script, Yoshihito Hishinuma in charge of the anime character designs and Kaoru Wada composing the music. The series aired from October 3, 2020, to March 20, 2021, on Yomiuri TV and Nippon TV. The series follows the trio of half-demon princesses (teenage daughters of Sesshomaru and Rin, Inuyasha and Kagome Higurashi) on a journey to protect seven magical rainbow pearls from villainous siblings and lesser adversaries. On March 20, 2021, a second season titled Yashahime: Princess Half-Demon - The Second Act, was announced for production after the first season. It aired from October 2, 2021, to March 26, 2022.

Viz Media announced it had acquired the rights to digital streaming, electronic sell-through (EST), and home video releases of the series for North and Latin American territories. Medialink also has announced that it has the rights to the series in Southeast Asian and South Asian territories. Viz Media streamed the series on Crunchyroll, Funimation and Hulu. On October 26, 2020, Funimation announced a partnership with Viz Media to release an American English dub of the series, with most of the English cast of Inuyasha reprising their roles. The English dub of the series began broadcast on Adult Swim's Toonami programming block on June 27, 2021.

Series overview

Episode list

Season 1 (2020–21)

Season 2: The Second Act (2021–22)

Notes

References

Yashahime: Princess Half-Demon
Yashahime